Listringen is a village of the municipality Bad Salzdetfurth in the district of Hildesheim, in Lower Saxony, Germany. It is situated approximately 9 km south of Hildesheim.

External links

 Listringen

Villages in Lower Saxony
Hildesheim (district)
Bad Salzdetfurth